The New Britain-New Ireland montane rain forests is a tropical moist forest ecoregion in Papua New Guinea. The ecoregion includes the mountain rain forests on the islands of New Britain and New Ireland, which lie northeast of New Guinea.

Geography
The ecoregion includes the montane rain forests on New Britain and New Ireland, two large islands in the Bismarck Archipelago lying northeast of New Guinea. it includes the portions of both islands above 1000 meters elevation.

New Britain is the largest island in the ecoregion, with an area of 36,520 km². New Ireland is the second-largest, with an area of 7,404 km². The archipelago is mostly made of volcanic rocks, with extensive areas of limestone. Several of the ecoregion's volcanoes are still active. The islands are generally mountainous. The highest point on New Britain is Mount Ulawun at 2,334 m (7,657 ft), and the highest point on New Ireland is Mount Taron at 2,340 m (7,680 ft). The montane rain forests are surrounded at lower elevations by the New Britain-New Ireland lowland rain forests.

Climate
The ecoregion has a montane tropical wet climate. Annual rainfall varies from 3000 to 6000 mm, depending on location. Temperature generally decreases with altitude, humidity increases, and fog and clouds are common.

Flora
The predominant vegetation in the ecoregion is montane tropical rain forest. The transition from lowland rain forest to montane rain forest is gradual. Above 1000 meters elevation, species composition and forest structure change. Montane forests generally have a lower canopy than the lowland forests and lack buttressed roots, and many trees have smaller, glossy, dark-green leaves, called as laurophyll or lucidophyll. Epiphytes, including mosses, lichens, and orchids, are abundant. Soils are generally richer in humus than lowland soils.

Common trees in the montane forests include species of Araucaria, Lithocarpus, Castanopsis, Nothofagus, Syzygium, and Ilex. Castanopsis and Lithocarpus are common in montane forests of New Britain and on New Guinea, but mostly absent from New Ireland. Metrosideros salomonensis dominates the high-elevation forests of New Ireland.

Fauna
The ecoregion has 45 species of mammals. The majority are bats, and the rest are murid rodents or marsupials.

The ecoregion has 3 endemic bird species – the New Britain goshawk (Accipiter princeps), Bismarck thicketbird (Megalurulus grosvenori) and Bismarck honeyeater (Vosea whitemanensis). There are 27 near-endemic species, many of which also inhabit the lowland rain forests ecoregion.

Protected areas 
A 2017 assessment found that 65 km², or less than 1%, of the ecoregion is in protected areas. About half of the unprotected area is still forested.

References 

Australasian ecoregions
Ecoregions of Papua New Guinea
Flora of the Bismarck Archipelago
Montane forests
Tropical and subtropical moist broadleaf forests